Igor Vladimirovich Eremenko (born 22 August 1997) is a retired Russian competitive ice dancer. With his former skating partner, Sofia Shevchenko, he is the 2019 World Junior bronze medalist and the 2018–19 Junior Grand Prix Final champion. He has also won seven ISU Junior Grand Prix medals, including gold medals at 2017 JGP Latvia and 2018 JGP Austria, and he has finished within the top five at the 2018 World Junior Championships.

Personal life 
Igor Vladimirovich Eremenko was born on 22 August 1997 in Rostov-on-Don, Rostov Oblast Russia.

Career

Early career 
Eremenko began learning to skate in 2003. Irina Zhuk and Alexander Svinin became his coaches in 2009.

Eremenko began competing internationally with Eva Khachaturian in the 2010–2011 season. They won advanced novice titles at the 2010 Pavel Roman Memorial and 2011 NRW Trophy before moving up to the junior level for the 2012–2013 season. They took the junior silver medal at the 2013 NRW Trophy and finished 8th at the 2014 Russian Junior Championships.

Eremenko teamed up with Sofia Shevchenko ahead of the 2014–2015 season. Shevchenko/Eremenko placed seventh at the 2015 Russian Junior Championships.

2015–2016 season 
Shevchenko/Eremenko received their first ISU Junior Grand Prix (JGP) assignments in the 2015–2016 season. They won bronze medals at both events, competing in late August in Bratislava, Slovakia and in October in Zagreb, Croatia. 

They placed seventh at the 2016 Russian Junior Championships. In February 2016, they won the junior gold medal at the Bavarian Open.

2016–2017 season 
Competing in the 2016 JGP series, Shevchenko/Eremenko placed fifth in August in Saint-Gervais-les-Bains, France, and received a bronze medal in September in Saransk, Russia. 

In November 2016, they won the gold medal at the NRW Trophy. They placed sixth at the 2017 Russian Junior Championships.

2017–2018 season 

Shevchenko/Eremenko won their first JGP gold medal in September at the 2017 JGP event in Riga, Latvia. They beat the silver medalists, their teammates and training partners Anastasia Shpilevaya / Grigory Smirnov, by only about one point. Three weeks later, at their second JGP event of the season, they won the silver medal in Zagreb, Croatia. With these results they qualified for the 2017–18 ISU Junior Grand Prix Final, where they finished fourth.

In January 2018, Shevchenko/Eremenko won the silver medal at the 2018 Russian Junior Championships after placing third in the short program and second in the free skate. In March 2018, they placed fourth in the short program, fourth in the free skate, and fifth overall at the 2018 World Junior Championships in Sofia, Bulgaria.

2018–2019 season 
Shevchenko/Eremenko started their season with gold at the 2018 JGP event in Linz, Austria. They ranked first in both segments and outscored the silver medalists, Marjorie Lajoie / Zachary Lagha, by a margin of about five points. At their second JGP event of the season they won a silver medal in Ljubljana, Slovenia. With one JGP gold medal and one silver medal they qualified for the 2018–19 Junior Grand Prix Final.

At the Final, Shevchenko/Eremenko won the gold medal after placing first in the rhythm dance and second in the free dance. They were part of a Russian sweep of the ice dance podium. Shevchenko/Eremenko beat the bronze medalists, Elizaveta Khudaiberdieva / Nikita Nazarov, by about 6 points but the race for the gold medal were extremely tight. Shevchenko/Eremenko won the gold medal by a margin of only 0.01 point over the silver medalists, Arina Ushakova / Maxim Nekrasov.

Shevchenko/Eremenko faced Ushakova/Nekrasov again at the 2019 Russian Junior Championships, and again prevailed, winning gold with first-place finishes in both segments.  They concluded the season at the 2019 World Junior Championships, where they placed third in the rhythm dance, behind both Lajoie/Lagha and Khudaiberdieva/Nazarov, having achieved only a Level 1 on the second part of the tango pattern dance.  Shevchenko/Eremenko placed second in the free dance, but this was insufficient to overcome Khudaiberdieva/Nazarov's lead from the rhythm dance, and they won the bronze medal.  Reflecting afterward, Shevchenko said "this was an amazing season for us, so emotional, and it was the best season of our career."  Eremenko noted that they would move to the senior level next.

2019–2020 season 
Shevchenko/Eremenko moved to the senior level for the 2019–2020 season.  Making their senior Grand Prix debut at 2019 Skate America, they placed ninth.  They were seventh at the 2019 NHK Trophy, setting three new personal bests.  At the 2020 Russian Championships, they placed sixth.

2020–2021 season 
Shevchenko/Eremenko debuted their programs at the senior Russian test skates. Competing on the domestic Cup of Russia series, they won the bronze medal at the first stage in Syzran.  They were scheduled to compete on the Grand Prix at the 2020 Rostelecom Cup, but withdrew after a COVID-19 outbreak at their training center.

Competing at the 2021 Russian Championships, Shevchenko/Eremenko placed fifth in both segments of the competition, for fourth place overall due to volatility from other competitors.

Following the national championships, Shevchenko/Eremenko participated in the 2021 Channel One Trophy, a televised team competition held in lieu of the cancelled European Championships.  They were selected for the Time of Firsts team captained by Evgenia Medvedeva.  They placed sixth in both their segments of the competition, while their team finished in second overall.

2021–2022 season 
Despite being eligible, Shevchenko/Eremenko were not included among the initial assignments for the 2021–22 Grand Prix series. Eremenko publicly protested this, as a number of lower-ranked Russian dance teams had been selected. They subsequently withdrew from the Russian test skates, citing medical reasons. They were subsequently invited to the 2021 NHK Trophy to replace withdrawn Chinese team Wang/Liu, and placed ninth at the event.

Programs 
(with Shevchenko)

Competitive highlights 
JGP: Junior Grand Prix

With Shevchenko

With Khachaturian

Detailed results 
Small medals for short and free programs awarded only at ISU Championships.

With Shevchenko

References

External links 
 

1997 births
Russian male ice dancers
World Junior Figure Skating Championships medalists
Living people
Sportspeople from Rostov-on-Don